Maxime Agueh (born 1 April 1978) is a former professional footballer who played as a goalkeeper. Born in France, he represented the Benin national team internationally.

Club career
Born in Lille, Agueh began his career with Lille OSC. On 1 July 1998, he signed for Luton Town F.C. where he played one year. In July 1999 he moved to Jupiler League club FC Denderleeuw EH where he stayed for two years

In summer 2001 Agueh returned to France, signing with Saint-Marcellin. He played one season here and signed with Championnat National club ASOA Valence. After three years with Valence, he signed 2005 for Acharnaikos F.C. In Greece played eight games in the Gamma Ethniki and signed in July 2006 with RFC Tournai for his second time in Belgium and played eleven games in the Jupiler League in the 2006–07 season. On 1 July 2007, after the end of the season, he signed with Ligue 2 club FC Gueugnon.

International career
Agueh was part of the Benin national team's 2004 African Nations Cup team, which finished bottom of its group in the first round of competition, thus failing to qualify for the next round. He played his first game in 2003 against Nigeria.

Personal life
His father Gabriel Kuessivi Agueh is Minister of Finance in Benin.

References

External links
 
 Profile on foot-national.com
 Profile on www.LFP.fr
 

1978 births
Living people
Citizens of Benin through descent
French sportspeople of Beninese descent
Footballers from Lille
Beninese footballers
French footballers
Association football goalkeepers
Benin international footballers
2004 African Cup of Nations players
ASOA Valence players
FC Gueugnon players
Lille OSC players
F.C.V. Dender E.H. players
Acharnaikos F.C. players
Beninese expatriate footballers
Beninese expatriate sportspeople in Belgium
Expatriate footballers in Belgium
Beninese expatriate sportspeople in Greece
Expatriate footballers in Greece
Black French sportspeople